Hamilton Fish Armstrong (April 7, 1893 – April 24, 1973) was an American diplomat and editor.

Biography
Armstrong attended Princeton University, then began a career in journalism at The New Republic. During the First World War, he was a military attaché in Serbia, sparking a lifelong interest in American relations with foreign states.

In 1922, at the request of editor Archibald Cary Coolidge, Armstrong became managing editor of Foreign Affairs, the journal of the newly formed Council on Foreign Relations. After Coolidge's death in 1928, Armstrong became editor, retiring from the position only in 1972, the fiftieth year of publication of the journal. He died after a long illness on April 24, 1973, at the age of 80.

Armstrong wrote many books, including the early Hitler's Reich: The First Phase (published in July, 1933, by The Macmillan Company).

Family
Armstrong was a member of the Fish Family of American politicians. Armstrong married three times.  Helen MacGregor Byrne became his wife in 1918; their only child, Helen MacGregor (later Mrs. Edwin Gamble), was born on September 3, 1923. Armstrong and Byrne divorced in 1938.  Later that year, she married Walter Lippmann, ending the friendship between the two men.

Armstrong married author Carman Barnes in 1945, a marriage which ended in a 1951 divorce. In that same year, Armstrong married Christa von Tippelskirch.

Awards
Hamilton Fish Armstrong was decorated by Serbia, Romania, Czechoslovakia, France, and the United Kingdom: 
 Order of the Serbian Red Cross (1918)
 Order of St. Sava Fifth Class (1918)
 Chevalier of Order of the White Eagle with Swords (1919)
 Order of the Crown (Rumania) (1924)
 Order of the White Lion of Czechoslovakia (1937)
 Officer of the Legion of Honor of France (1937; commander, 1947)
 Commander of the Order of the British Empire (1972)

He received honorary degrees from Brown (1942), Yale (1957), Basel (1960), Princeton (1961), Columbia (1963), and Harvard (1963) universities.

Publications

Books
 The New Balkans (1926)
 Where the East Begins (1929)
 Hitler's Reich: The First Phase (1933)
 Europe Between Wars? (1934)
 Can We Be Neutral? (with Allen W. Dulles) (1936)
 "We or They": Two Worlds in Conflict (1936)
 When There Is No Peace. New York: Macmillan (1939)
 Can America Stay Neutral? (with Allen W. Dulles) (1939)
 Chronology of Failure: The Last Days of the French Republic. New York: Macmillan (1940)
 The Calculated Risk (1947)
 Tito and Goliath (1951)
 Those Days (1963)
 Peace and Counterpeace: From Wilson to Hitler: Memoirs of Hamilton Armstrong Fish. New York: Harper & Row (1971)

Contributions
 Introduction to Refugees: Anarchy or Organization? by Dorothy Thompson. New York: Random House (1938), pp. ix-xi.

References

Further reading
 Suri, Jeremi (Spring 2002). "Hamilton Fish Armstrong, the 'American Establishment,' and Cosmopolitan Nationalism." Princeton University Library Chronicle, vol. 63, no. 3, pp. 438–65. . .

External links
 Hamilton Fish Armstrong Papers at the Seeley G. Mudd Manuscript Library, Princeton University

1893 births
1973 deaths
American diplomats
Princeton University alumni
Fish family
American expatriates in the Kingdom of Serbia